Otto Olsen (12 December 1894 – 24 October 1989) was a Danish modern pentathlete. He competed at the 1924 and 1928 Summer Olympics.

References

External links
 

1894 births
1989 deaths
People from Næstved
Danish male modern pentathletes
Olympic modern pentathletes of Denmark
Modern pentathletes at the 1924 Summer Olympics
Modern pentathletes at the 1928 Summer Olympics
Sportspeople from Region Zealand